

List of countries

Micronesia